Adam Scheier (born April 12, 1973) is an American football coach and former player. He currently works for Temple. He previously served as the Bowling Green interim head coach during the 2013 Little Caesars Pizza Bowl, as Dave Clawson had left to take the head coaching job at Wake Forest University. He also served as the special teams coordinator for the Rutgers Scarlet Knights football team.

Playing career
Scheier played college football at Dartmouth College where he was named the Special Teams Player of the Year as a senior. He earned his degree in psychology from Dartmouth shortly after his playing career concluded in 1995. He began coaching at Dartmouth the following year.

Head coaching record

References

1973 births
Living people
Bowling Green Falcons football coaches
Columbia Lions football coaches
Dartmouth Big Green football coaches
Dartmouth Big Green football players
Lehigh Mountain Hawks football coaches
Mississippi State Bulldogs football coaches
Ohio State Buckeyes football coaches
Princeton Tigers football coaches
Rutgers Scarlet Knights football coaches
Temple Owls football coaches
Texas Tech Red Raiders football coaches
Wake Forest Demon Deacons football coaches
Sportspeople from the Bronx
Coaches of American football from New York (state)
Players of American football from New York City